The Bad News Bears is a 1976 American sports comedy film directed by Michael Ritchie and written by Bill Lancaster. It stars Walter Matthau as an alcoholic ex-baseball pitcher who becomes a coach for a youth baseball team known as the Bears. Alongside Matthau, the film's cast includes Tatum O'Neal, Vic Morrow,
Joyce Van Patten, Ben Piazza, Jackie Earle Haley, and Alfred W. Lutter. Its score, composed by Jerry Fielding, adapts the principal themes of Bizet's opera Carmen.

Released by Paramount Pictures, The Bad News Bears received generally positive reviews. It was followed by two sequels, The Bad News Bears in Breaking Training in 1977 and The Bad News Bears Go to Japan in 1978, a short-lived 1979–80 CBS television series, and a 2005 remake.

Plot
In 1976, Morris Buttermaker, an alcoholic pool cleaner and former minor-league baseball pitcher, is recruited to coach "the Bears", a youth baseball league expansion team of misfit players in Southern California, formed as a settlement to a lawsuit brought against the league for excluding such players from other teams. Shunned by the more competitive teams (and competitive parents and coaches), the Bears are the outsiders, and the least talented team in the league. Buttermaker forfeits the opening game after the team allows 26 runs without recording an out.

With the entire team wanting to quit due to the humiliation of their first loss, Buttermaker recruits two unlikely prospects: sharp-tongued Amanda Wurlitzer, a skilled pitcher (trained by Buttermaker when she was younger) and the 11-year-old daughter of one of Buttermaker's ex-girlfriends; and the local cigarette-smoking, loan-sharking, Harley-Davidson-riding troublemaker, Kelly Leak, who also happens to be the best athlete in the area, but has been excluded from playing in the past by league officials. With Amanda and Kelly on board, the team starts gaining more confidence, and the Bears start winning games. The subplot reveals the strained relationship between Buttermaker and Amanda as the team improves.

Eventually, the Bears make it to the championship game opposite the top-notch Yankees, who are coached by aggressive, competitive Roy Turner. As the game progresses, tensions rise between the teams and the coaches, as Buttermaker and Turner engage in ruthless behavior toward each other and the players in order to win the game. When Turner strikes his son, the pitcher, for ignoring orders by intentionally throwing at another child's head (an action which occasionally occurs in baseball but which is against the rules, frowned upon, and extremely dangerous) Buttermaker realizes that he, too, has placed too much emphasis on winning, and puts in his benchwarmers to allow everyone to play. The Bears lose in the end, but despite Buttermaker's move, they nearly win the game.  Buttermaker gives the team beer which they spray on each other with a field celebration as if they had won.

Cast

Top billed, shown in opening credits, were Matthau, O'Neal and Morrow.

Adults
 Walter Matthau as Morris Buttermaker, coach of the Bears: A drunken, loud, ex-professional baseball pitcher and part-time pool cleaner, who drives a rundown blue Cadillac convertible
 Vic Morrow as Roy Turner, coach of the Yankees who is competitive and aggressive.
 Joyce Van Patten as Cleveland, league manager who favors Roy and the Yankees.
 Ben Piazza as Bob Whitewood, city councilman and lawyer who sued the league to allow the Bears (in particular, his son) to play and who convinces (and pays) Buttermaker to coach the team.

Children
 Tatum O'Neal as Amanda Wurlitzer, the 11-year-old star pitcher for the Bears who feels insecure about her tomboy image. She is recruited by Buttermaker to help the team start winning. She is no-nonsense and a great pitcher who was taught by Buttermaker when she was young. The boys grow to be very protective of her, picking a fight with their rivals during the championship game when Amanda is kicked in the chest. Her mother is Buttermaker's ex-girlfriend and she looks to him as a father figure. Amanda and Tanner butt heads a lot, but respect each other. She also has a secret crush on Kelly.
 Chris Barnes as Tanner Boyle, the short-tempered shortstop with a Napoleon complex; after suffering a horrible loss on their first game, he picks a fight with the entire seventh grade from the boys' middle school (and loses). He tends to curse more than the others, and initially insults and bullies Timmy before realizing he's treating Timmy no better than the kids from their rival team and becomes protective of him, leading to an unlikely friendship between them. He is also close friends with Ahmad.
 Jackie Earle Haley as Kelly Leak, the local troublemaker who smokes and rides a mini Harley-Davidson motorcycle. Kelly is also the best athlete in the neighborhood. At first, he doesn't want to join when Amanda attempts to recruit him, but he changes his mind when Coach Turner threatens him. He alternates between left- and center-field and has a crush on Amanda. After joining the team, he forms close friendships with Tanner, Ahmad and Ogilvie.
 Erin Blunt as Ahmad Abdul-Rahim, a black Muslim boy who plays in the outfield, is liked by everyone on the team and adores Hank Aaron; Ahmad strips off his uniform in shame after committing several errors in the Bears' first game, but is convinced to return to the team by Buttermaker and is used for bunts in games due to his speed. He is shown to be close friends with Tanner.
 Gary Lee Cavagnaro as Mike Engelberg, an overweight boy who plays catcher; a great hitter, he frequently teases Tanner about his size. He breaks Buttermaker's windshield with a baseball at the first practice. He has a deep rivalry with Yankee pitcher Joey, causing them to throw insults at each other.
 Alfred W. Lutter as Alfred Ogilvie, a bookworm who memorizes baseball statistics. He's mostly a bench-warmer who assists Buttermaker with defensive strategy. A backup outfielder/first baseman, but reluctant to play because he feels he's one of the lesser-skilled players on the team.
 Quinn Smith as Timmy Lupus, initially described by Tanner as a "booger-eating spaz", plays right-field and is considered to be the worst player on the team — if not the entire league — but he surprises everyone in the championship game by making a key play to keep the Bears in the game. He is the most quiet and shy player, but shows the odd ability to properly prepare a martini for Coach Buttermaker while the team was assisting the coach with pool cleaning.
 David Stambaugh as Toby Whitewood, an unassuming boy who plays first base. He knows about the other players' personalities, is intelligent and well-spoken, and at times speaks on behalf of the team. He is the son of councilman Bob Whitewood, who secretly paid Buttermaker to coach the team.
 Jaime Escobedo as Jose Aguilar, Miguel's older brother who plays second base and doesn't speak English.
 George Gonzales as Miguel Aguilar, Jose's younger brother; mostly plays right-field. He does not speak English. He is so short that the strike zone is practically non-existent.
 David Pollock as Rudi Stein, a nervous relief pitcher with glasses who is a terrible hitter; at times he is asked by Coach Buttermaker to purposely get hit by pitches in order to get on base. Also a backup outfielder.
 Brett Marx as Jimmy Feldman, a fairly quiet third baseman with curly blond hair.
 Scott Firestone as Regi Tower, a fairly quiet, red-headed third baseman whose dad vocally attends practices and games. He plays first base.
 Brandon Cruz as Joey Turner, the star pitcher for the Yankees and a coach Roy Turner's son. He has a rivalry with Engelberg and regularly bullies Tanner and Timmy. He allows Engelberg an inside-the-park home run, then quits the team after Roy slaps him in anger for almost beaning Engelberg.

Production
The Bad News Bears was filmed in and around Los Angeles, primarily in the San Fernando Valley. The field where they played is in Mason Park on Mason Avenue in Chatsworth. In the film, the Bears were sponsored by an actual local company, "Chico's Bail Bonds". One scene was filmed in the council chamber at Los Angeles City Hall.

Matthau was paid $750,000 plus over 10% of the theatrical rentals. Tatum O'Neal was paid $350,000 plus a percentage of the profits. These were later estimated to be $1.9 million.

Reception
Rotten Tomatoes gives the film a score of 97% based on reviews from 30 critics and an average rating of 7.6/10. The site's critical consensus reads, "The Bad News Bears is rude, profane, and cynical, but shot through with honest, unforced humor, and held together by a deft, understated performance from Walter Matthau."

In his 1976 review, critic Roger Ebert gave the film three stars out of four and called it "an unblinking, scathing look at competition in American society." Gene Siskel awarded two-and-a-half stars out of four, calling the film's characters "more types than people" and the kids' foul-mouth dialogue "overdone," though he found O'Neal's performance "genuinely affecting." Variety called it "the funniest adult-child comedy film since 'Paper Moon'," and lauded the "excellent" script. Kevin Thomas of the Los Angeles Times declared it "the best American screen comedy of the year to date," adding, "Bright, pugnacious and utterly realistic as most children seem to be today, these kids are drawn with much accuracy and are played beautifully." Vincent Canby of The New York Times found the film only "occasionally funny" but praised screenwriter Bill Lancaster for "the talent and discipline to tell the story of 'The Bad News Bears' almost completely in terms of what happens on the baseball diamond or in the dugout." Gary Arnold of The Washington Post praised it as "a lively, spontaneously funny entertainment" that "could rally a large parallel audience seeking less innocuous and stereotyped pictures with and about children." Tom Milne of The Monthly Film Bulletin called it "miraculously funny and entirely delightful."

Awards
Walter Matthau was nominated for a BAFTA award for Best Performance by an Actor in a Comedy. The screenplay by Bill Lancaster, son of actor Burt Lancaster, was winner of a Writers Guild of America award.

Saturday Night Live did a parody of the film with Matthau as the guest host called The Bad News Bees with John Belushi, Dan Aykroyd and the rest in their recurring bee costumes for what would be their final time. This subtly referenced masturbation which was alluded to as "buzzing-off".

American Film Institute
 AFI's 100 Years...100 Laughs—nominated
 AFI's 10 Top 10—nominated sports film
 AFI's 100 Years...100 Cheers—nominated

See also 
 The Bad News Bears (TV series)

References

External links

 
 
 
 
 
 

Bad News Bears (franchise)
1970s English-language films
1970s sports comedy films
1976 films
American baseball films
American sports comedy films
American coming-of-age comedy films
Fictional sports teams
Films adapted into television shows
Films about alcoholism
Films directed by Michael Ritchie
Films scored by Jerry Fielding
Films set in the San Fernando Valley
Films set in Los Angeles
Films shot in Los Angeles
Paramount Pictures films
1970s Spanish-language films
1976 comedy films
1970s American films